The following list of mines in Ireland is subsidiary to the lists of mines articles. This list contains working, defunct and proposed mines in the country and is organised by the primary mineral output(s).

Mines

Coal mines
Ballingarry Coal Mines
Deerpark Mines

Lead mines
Ballycorus Leadmines
Galmoy Mine
Lisheen Mine
Tara Mine

Zinc Mines
Galmoy Mine
Lisheen Mine
Tara Mine

Mining companies                                                     
Historically, mines were operated privately, but in 1824 an Act of Parliament established the Mining Company of Ireland.

In the 21st century, mining companies operating in Ireland include:
Boliden AB - Boliden operates the Tara zinc-lead-silver mine in County Meath, the largest zinc mine in Europe.
Conroy Gold and Natural Resources - Developing the Clontibret gold project of Co. Monaghan. 
Minco Exploration - Minco engages in base metals exploration in Counties Galway, Meath, and Westmeath.

See also
Irish gold

References

Ireland